Raimonds Elbakjans (born 13 May 1986) is a former Latvian basketball player  who founded an international youth movement Ghetto Games. He is the leader and the main fundraiser in the non-government organization of multi-sport events Ghetto Games.

Career
Raimonds Elbakjans was born on May 13, 1986, in Riga. He begun to play basketball for Riga's children and youth sports school “Ridzene” from 1994 till 2002, where he played with 1984 and 1985 years born teammates. He played in the Latvian National Basketball U18 Team, then in 2005 in the youth club, in ASKA Riga. But due to his health condition he was forced to quit professional basketball.

Ghetto Games

After his basketball career, he decided to create basketball tournaments for himself and his friends – Ghetto Basket. In two years, the Ghetto Basket movement turned into the Ghetto Games. Later, more active sport leaders joined the movement, to be united under one street sport family – Ghetto Games. Since then Elbakjans is the leader of multi-sport event movement Ghetto Games.
Ghetto Games is a non-government organization of multi-sport events, youth street sports, and cultural movement that includes 3x3 basketball, 3x3 football, 3x3 floorball, Ghetto Fight, Street Dance - Ghetto Dance, and such extreme sports as BMX, Skateboarding, Extreme Inline, Scooters, Wakeboarding and other.

Personal life
Elbakjans has two sons Robert Elbakjans and Rodrigo Elbakjans, also a daughter Adriana Elbakjana. In January 2021, Elbakjans married in Georgia to Tamara Bagdavadze.

Honors
 2016 European Commissions initiated award – #BeActive: Local Hero Award winner
 2014 TEDxRiga 2014 winner

References

External links
 Medicine for the ghetto | Raimonds Elbakjans | TEDxRiga

1986 births
Living people
Latvian basketball players